Canistro is a comune (municipality) and town in the province of L'Aquila in the Abruzzo region of central Italy.

Geography 
Canistro, located in the Roveto valley, borders to the north with Capistrello and the frazione of Pescocanale, to the east with the municipality of Luco dei Marsi, to the south with Civitella Roveto and to the west with the mountainous territory of Filettino, in Lazio, from which it is separated from the Simbruini mountains. At the bottom of the valley the municipal territory is crossed by the  Liri river. Canistro is a famous spa town.

References

Cities and towns in Abruzzo
Marsica
Spa towns in Italy